Johann Gustav Hermes (20 June 1846 – 8 June 1912) was a German mathematician. Hermes is known for completion of a polygon with 65,537 sides.

Early life 
On 20 June 1846, Hermes was born in Königsberg, a former German city (presently Kaliningrad, Russia). Hermes was educated at the Kneiphöfischen Gymnasium.  He undertook his Abitur (final examination) at the school in 1866.  After completing his secondary education, he studied mathematics from 1866 to 1870, mostly in Königsberg. His studies were interrupted due to his participation in the Franco-Prussian War between 1870 and 1871.

Education 
On 14 December 1872, Hermes complete his studies and earned a degree in mathematics. 
On 5 April 1879, Hermes received a doctorate degree and his dissertation was on the "Reduction of the problem of cyclotomy on linear equations (for prime numbers of the form 2m+1)" (German: "Zurückführung des Problems der Kreistheilung auf lineare Gleichungen (für Primzahlen von der Form 2m+1)").

Career 
After a probationary year at the Chernyakhovsk Realgymnasium in 1873, Hermes worked as a teacher at the Progymnasium of the Royal Orphanage of Königsberg in Prussia (German: Königliches Waisenhaus zu Königsberg in Preußen). Beginning in 1883 he was an Oberlehrer (or upper teacher). In 1893 he became a professor at the Georgianum Gymnasium in Lingen. Finally, on 1 April 1899, he became a professor and director at the Osnabrück Realgymnasium (now named the Ernst-Moritz-Arndt-Gymnasium). 

On 31 December 1906 he asked for an early retirement from his position due to illness.

Achievements 
In 1894, Hermes completed his decade-long effort to find and write down a procedure for the construction of the regular 65537-gon exclusively with a compass and a straightedge. His manuscript, with over 200 pages, is today located at the University of Göttingen.

In his maiden speech as the director at the Osnabrück Realgymnasium on 11 April 1899, he praised the concept of duty of the influential philosopher Immanuel Kant, who was also a resident of Königsberg. He finished with the words "Geduld ist die Pforte der Freude." ("Patience is the gate to joy.")

Personal life 
In December 1906, Hermes became ill.

On 8 June 1912, Hermes died. Hermes is buried in Osnabrück, Germany.

See also 
 65537-gon
 List of polygons

References

External links
  (About the division of the circle into 65537 equal pieces)
 Other publications by Hermes

1846 births
1912 deaths
19th-century German mathematicians
20th-century German mathematicians
German military personnel of the Franco-Prussian War
Scientists from Königsberg
People from the Province of Prussia
Prussian Army personnel